The fourth season of the television series Buffy the Vampire Slayer premiered on October 5, 1999, on The WB and concluded its 22-episode season on May 23, 2000. It maintained its previous timeslot, airing Tuesdays at 8:00 pm ET. Beginning with this season, the character of Angel was given his own series, which aired on The WB following Buffy. Various Buffy characters made appearances in Angel, including Buffy herself; Cordelia Chase, formerly a regular in Buffy, and Wesley Wyndam-Pryce, who appeared in Buffy season three.

Plot 
Season four sees Buffy and Willow enroll at UC Sunnydale while Xander joins the workforce. The vampire Spike, having been left by Drusilla, returns to Sunnydale and is abducted by the Initiative, a top-secret military installation based beneath the UC Sunnydale campus, led by Maggie Walsh. They implant a microchip in his head which prevents him from harming humans. He reluctantly helps the Scooby Gang throughout the season and even begins to fight on their side after joyfully learning that he can harm fellow demons. Buffy and her friends still don't trust him, except Willow who opts to give him a chance to redeem himself, which he eventually does.

Oz leaves town after realizing that he is too dangerous as a werewolf and after an horrific encounter with the Initiative. Willow falls in love with Tara Maclay, another witch, and  the two begin a relationship.

Another focus of the season is Xander's relationship with former vengeance demon Anya Jenkins, who becomes infatuated with him due to him making her feel human and Xander returns these feelings as she makes him feel like a man. Anya tries to get Xander off her mind, but feelings develop which they finally acknowledge and begin a relationship.

Buffy begins dating Riley Finn, a grad student who she later discovers is a member of the Initiative. Riley tries to involve Buffy in the organization, initially it seems successful, with Initiative leader Professor Walsh impressed with Buffy's incredible fighting skills, and allowing her a security pass and pager, but Buffy's questions and non-military free spirit worry Walsh who sees it as a threat to her plans and potential bad influence on Riley, threatening his allegiance to the Initiative. After Buffy and Riley's first sexual encounter, seen by Walsh via a hidden camera, Walsh plots to kill Buffy, which fails but causes Riley to cut ties with Walsh and the Initiative.

The Initiative's more sinister secret purpose is revealed when its composite demonic cyborg, Adam, kills Walsh, then escapes and rampages through the town. After getting Spike to temporarily work for him, Adam plots to create others like him to overthrow humanity, although Adam sees Riley as his "brother".

Buffy and her allies unite to defeat Adam and destroy the Initiative. The demons and other supernatural creatures fight back against their former captors, while the Scoobies temporarily transfer all their skills into Buffy to fight the physically superior Adam. Magically enhanced, she kills Adam by ripping out his uranium core. The Initiative is defeated and the Scoobies recover. The government recognizes that Prof. Maggie Walsh's plan is a failure, and orders her project to be terminated. The Scoobies later encounter the spirit of The First Slayer, who gives Buffy a cryptic message.

Cast and characters

Main cast 
 Sarah Michelle Gellar as Buffy Summers
 Nicholas Brendon as Xander Harris
 Alyson Hannigan as Willow Rosenberg
 Seth Green as Daniel "Oz" Osbourne
 Marc Blucas as Riley Finn
 James Marsters as Spike
 Anthony Stewart Head as Rupert Giles

Recurring cast

Guest cast

Crew 
Series creator Joss Whedon served as executive producer and showrunner, and wrote and directed four episodes including the season premiere and finale. Marti Noxon was promoted to supervising producer and wrote or co-wrote five episodes. Jane Espenson was promoted to co-producer and wrote or co-wrote five episodes. David Fury, who as a freelancer had written or co-written three episodes in seasons 2 and 3, was hired as producer and wrote or co-wrote four episodes. Douglas Petrie was promoted to executive story editor and wrote three episodes. The only new addition was Tracey Forbes, who served as a staff writer and wrote three episodes.

James A. Contner (also co-producer) directed the highest number of episodes in the fourth season, directing six episodes. Joss Whedon and David Grossman each directed four.

Episodes

Crossovers with Angel 
Beginning with this season, Buffy the Vampire Slayer and its spin-off Angel both aired on The WB Television Network. Both shows aired on Tuesdays, Buffy at 8:00 PM ET, and Angel at 9:00 PM ET. The fourth season of Buffy aired along with the first season of Angel. Both shows featured crossover episodes, in which characters of one series appeared in the other. Angel (David Boreanaz), Cordelia Chase (Charisma Carpenter) and Wesley Wyndam-Pryce (Alexis Denisof), who had been introduced in Buffy, became main characters in the spinoff series.

The first crossover appeared in the premiere episodes, where Angel calls Buffy but doesn't say anything; on Buffy, she is seen answering the phone. After the events of "The Harsh Light of Day", Oz (Seth Green) visits Los Angeles in the Angel episode "In the Dark" to give Angel the Gem of Amara (a ring that makes vampires unkillable), and Spike (James Marsters) follows him.

In the Angel episode "Bachelor Party", Doyle (Glenn Quinn) has a vision of Buffy in danger. This causes Angel to secretly visit Sunnydale in the episode "Pangs", to protect her. After learning that he was in town, Buffy (Sarah Michelle Gellar) visits L.A. in the Angel episode "I Will Remember You" to express her displeasure in his not telling her that he was there.

Buffy season three recurring character Wesley Wyndam-Pryce (Alexis Denisof) makes his first appearance on Angel in "Parting Gifts" and would become a series regular in the next episode for the remainder of the series.

After the events of the two-part episode "This Year's Girl" and "Who Are You", Faith (Eliza Dushku) leaves Sunnydale and goes to L.A. in the Angel two-part episode "Five by Five" and "Sanctuary" and is hired by Wolfram & Hart to kill Angel. Buffy makes her second and final appearance on Angel in "Sanctuary".

Angel visits Sunnydale again in "The Yoko Factor" to apologize to Buffy after the way he treated her in "Sanctuary". Angel meets Buffy's new boyfriend, Riley Finn (Marc Blucas).

The vampire Darla (Julie Benz), who was killed in Buffy episode "Angel", is resurrected by Wolfram & Hart in the Angel season one finale, "To Shanshu in L.A.", and subsequently becomes a recurring character there.

Reception 
The fourth season averaged 5.1 million viewers. 

The season received three Primetime Emmy Award nominations, for Outstanding Hairstyling for a Series for "Beer Bad", Outstanding Cinematography for a Single Camera Series (Michael Gershman) for "Hush", and Outstanding Writing for a Drama Series (Joss Whedon) for "Hush".

Sarah Michelle Gellar was nominated for a Golden Globe Award for Best Actress – Television Series Drama. 

The season was nominated for two Television Critics Association Awards, for Outstanding Achievement in Drama and Program of the Year.

In particular, the episode "Hush" was highly praised when it aired. Robert Bianco from USA Today comments, "(i)n a medium in which producers tend to grow bored with their own creations, either trashing them or taking them in increasingly bizarre directions, Whedon continues to find new ways to make his fabulously entertaining series richer and more compelling. With or without words, he's a TV treasure." Alan Sepinwall in The Star-Ledger calls it a "magnificently daring episode", explaining "(w)hat makes it particularly brave is that, even when Buffy has been failing to click dramatically this year, the show has still been able to get by on the witty dialogue, which is all but absent after the first few scenes. Whedon finds ways to get around that, with several cast members—particularly Anthony Head as the scholarly Giles and Alyson Hannigan as nervous witch Willow—proving to be wonderfully expressive silent comedians." In the New York Daily News, David Bianculli states that the episode is "a true tour de force, and another inventive triumph for this vastly underrated series." Robert Hanks from The Independent in the UK writes that "Buffy the Vampire Slayer, in most weeks the funniest and cleverest programme on TV, reached new heights" with "Hush". Noel Murray in The A.V. Club calls it an "episode unlike any other, with a lusher score and some of the most genuinely disturbing imagery I’ve yet seen on Buffy." The episode was included among 13 of the scariest films or television shows by Salon.com, and justified by Stephanie Zacharek, who states it "scans just like one of those listless dreams in which you try to scream, and can't. Everybody's had 'em—and yet the way the eerie quiet of 'Hush' sucks you in, you feel as if the experience is privately, and unequivocally, your own." Following the series finale in 2003, "Hush" continued to receive praise. Lisa Rosen in the Los Angeles Times states that the episode is "one of TV's most terrifying hours". Smashing Magazine counted "Hush" as one of the top ten television episodes that inspire creativity. Keith McDuffee of TV Squad named it the best Buffy episode in the series, writing "(i)f someone who had never seen Buffy (blasphemy!) asked me to show them just one episode of the show to get them hooked, this would be it". TV.com named it as the fourth most frightening episode in television history.

The Futon Critic named "Restless" the best episode of 2000.

Rotten Tomatoes gave season four a score of 67% with an average rating of 7 out of 10 based on 15 reviews. The site's critics consensus states, "Buffy enters its fourth season on shaky ground but finishes with a surprisingly satisfying season finale."

DVD release 
Buffy the Vampire Slayer: The Complete Fourth Season was released on DVD in region 1 on June 10, 2003 and in region 2 on May 13, 2002. The DVD includes all 22 episodes on 6 discs presented in full frame 1.33:1 aspect ratio (region 1) and in anamorphic widescreen 1.78:1 aspect ratio (region 2 and 4). Special features on the DVD include seven commentary tracks—"Wild at Heart" by creator Joss Whedon, writer Marti Noxon, and actor Seth Green (region 1 only); "The Initiative" by writer Doug Petrie; "Hush" by writer and director Joss Whedon; "This Year's Girl" by writer Doug Petrie; "Superstar" by writer Jane Espenson; "Primeval" by writer David Fury and director James A. Contner; and "Restless" by writer and director Joss Whedon. Scripts for "Fear, Itself", "Hush", and "Who Are You?" are included. Featurettes include, "Spike Me", which details the character of Spike; "Oz Revelations: A Full Moon", which details the departure of the character with insights by actor Seth Green; "Hush", where cast and crew members discuss the unique episode; "Buffy: Inside Sets of Sunnydale" showcases all the sets on the show with tours of sets; "Buffy: Inside the Music", which details the music and bands featured on the show; and "Season 4 Overview", a 30-minute featurette where cast and crew members discuss the season. Also included are cast biographies and photo galleries.

Notes

References

External links 
 
 List of Buffy the Vampire Slayer season 4 episodes at BuffyGuide.com
 

 
1999 American television seasons
2000 American television seasons